Evans Kiplagat Chebet (born 10 November 1988) is a Kenyan long-distance runner who competes in road races. In September 2019, after finishing in the top six of every marathon he had finished, Chebet won his first international race, the Buenos Aires Marathon, in a time of 2:05:00. The year after, in March 2020, he won the Lake Biwa Marathon with 2:07:29. In December of the same year, Chebet lowered his personal best by exactly two minutes and set a world lead when he won the 2020 Valencia Marathon in 2:03:00, kicking down Lawrence Cherono and winning by four seconds.

In 2022, he won as just the third man this century both the Boston Marathon and New York City Marathon.

Results

Personal bests
 10 kilometres – 29:39 (Boston, MA 2022)
 10 miles – 45:06 (Tilburg 2017)
 Half marathon – 1:01:59 (Porto 2012)
 Marathon – 2:03:00 (Valencia 2020)

References

External Links

Living people
1988 births
Kenyan male long-distance runners
Kenyan male marathon runners
Boston Marathon male winners